Galen M. Davis (6 February 1951 – 7 February 2005) was an American police officer and politician.

Davis was a native of Ottumwa, Iowa, born on 6 February 1951. He worked for the Ottumwa Police Department for three decades, and was promoted to sergeant in 1987. He was active in several law enforcement organizations, and was a member of civic and political organizations at the county level. Davis was a Republican, and served a single term in the Iowa House of Representatives from District 93 between 1999 and 2001. He died on 7 February 2005, aged 54.

References

American municipal police officers
Republican Party members of the Iowa House of Representatives
20th-century American politicians
21st-century American politicians
People from Ottumwa, Iowa
1951 births
2005 deaths